Eliteserien (literally, "The Elite League") is top-division men's football league in Norway.

Eliteserien may also refer to:
 GET-ligaen, the highest icehockey league
 Eliteserien (men's handball), the highest handball league for men
 Eliteserien (women's handball), the highest handball league for women
 Norwegian Futsal Premier League, the highest futsal league
 the Norwegian Bandy Premier League, the highest bandy league
 Eliteserien i volleyball, the highest volleyball league
 The former name of Toppserien, the highest football league for women
 The former name of AL-Bank Ligaen, the top-division ice hockey league in Denmark.

See also
Elitserien (disambiguation)